Ray McDonald (June 27, 1920 – February 20, 1959) was a tap dancer who started his career as a vaudeville act with his older sister Grace McDonald, before being cast in a hit Broadway show, and then in films. He had a starring role in the films Down in San Diego and Born to Sing, some leading roles in other films, as well as lesser roles including in uncredited dance sequences.

McDonald's Broadway credits include Park Avenue (1946), Winged Victory (1943), Crazy With the Heat (1941), and Babes in Arms (1937).

Personal life
McDonald was born in New York City. His sister Grace was two years older. She was contracted to Universal while he signed with MGM.

He was married to actress Elisabeth Fraser from 1944 until 1952 and then actress Peggy Ryan from 1953 until 1957. In 1949, he appeared with her in There's a Girl in My Heart and co-starred with her in the musical Shamrock Hill. On December 4, 1956, they guest starred on the Mickey Mouse Club.

He died in 1959 at age 38 in New York City after choking on food in his hotel room.

Filmography

References

External links
 

1921 births
1959 deaths
20th-century American male actors
American male film actors
American male stage actors
Male actors from New York City
American male dancers
Vaudeville performers
Deaths from choking